Simone Pinna (born 17 October 1997) is an Italian footballer who plays as a defender.

Club career
He made his Serie C debut for Olbia on 4 September 2016 in a game against Lucchese.

He made his Serie A debut for Cagliari on 25 August 2019, playing a full game against Brescia.

On 9 January 2020, he joined Empoli in Serie B on loan.

On 11 January 2021 he moved on loan to Ascoli.

On 31 August 2021, he returned to Olbia on a permanent basis and signed a two-year contract. On 1 September 2022, Pinna's contract with Olbia was terminated by mutual consent.

References

External links
 
 

1997 births
Living people
People from Oristano
Footballers from Sardinia
Italian footballers
Association football defenders
Serie A players
Serie B players
Serie C players
Serie D players
Cagliari Calcio players
Olbia Calcio 1905 players
Empoli F.C. players
Ascoli Calcio 1898 F.C. players